P. F. Chang's China Bistro is an American-based, casual dining restaurant chain founded in 1993 by Paul Fleming and Philip Chiang that serves Asian fusion cuisine. Centerbridge Partners owned and operated Chang's until acquired by the private equity firm TriArtisan Capital Advisors on March 2, 2019. P. F. Chang's is headquartered in Scottsdale, Arizona.

The chain specializes in American Chinese cuisine, plus other Asian dishes. P.F. Chang’s operates 300 locations in 22 countries and U.S. airports, including P.F. Chang’s To Go takeout locations.

The name "P. F. Chang's" is derived from those of Paul Fleming (P. F.) and Philip Chiang (whose surname was simplified to Chang).

History

 
The chain was founded in 1993 by Paul Fleming and Philip Chiang - son of Cecilia Chiang. The first restaurant was opened at the Scottsdale Fashion Square in Scottsdale, Arizona. In 1993, P.F. Chang's China Bistro, Inc. was formed from the acquisition of the original four bistro restaurants.

In 2010, "P.F. Chang's Home Menu" was introduced in supermarkets. The brand represents a group of frozen appetizers and meals that were sold under license by Unilever.

In 2012 Chang's accepted an offer from private investment firm, Centerbridge Partners in a deal valued at $1.1 billion.

ConAgra Foods, Inc. acquired the P.F. Chang's Home Menu license from Unilever in August 2012.

In December 2017, Chang's announced that they would open a location in Shanghai during the first part of 2018, Chang's first location in China.

In January 2019, Chang's announced it was in talks to be sold to TriArtisan Capital Partners and Paulson & Co. for approximately $700 million from its previous owner, Centerbridge Partners.

In January 2020, Chang’s announced its first P.F. Chang’s To Go take-out only location will be in Chicago, Illinois. Chang's obtained more than $5 million in small-business loans as part of the Paycheck Protection Program (coronavirus relief).

2004 restatement
On March 15, 2004, Chang's reported that it had modified its partnership accounting, which resulted in a restatement of its financial results for prior years. On March 17, 2005, the company adjusted its accounting for leases in order to conform with U.S. generally accepted accounting principles. Accordingly, management and the audit committee determined that the company's previously issued consolidated financial statements, including those in the company's Annual Report on Form 10-K for the fiscal year ended Dec. 28, 2003, and those in the company's Quarterly Reports on Form 10-Q for the first three fiscal quarters of 2004, should no longer be relied upon.

Menu

The chain specializes in Asian fusion cuisine. Special items on their menu include their Chang's Lettuce Wraps, Chang's Spicy Chicken, Peking duck, and various types of sushi. Wine, specialty drinks, Asian beers, sake, cappuccino, and espresso are available outside standard beverage offerings.

Data breaches

2013–14 credit card breach
In mid-2014, information regarding credit card breaches at P.F. Chang's restaurant was brought to light by various sources, and later confirmed by P.F. Chang's.

2018 security vulnerability
On April 9, 2018, independent security researcher Akshay 'Ax' Sharma demonstrated a security flaw in P.F. Chang's Rewards program which enabled leakage of members' information, due to a poorly implemented API.

See also
 List of Chinese restaurants

References

External links
 

1993 establishments in Arizona
Companies based in Scottsdale, Arizona
Fast casual restaurants
Private equity portfolio companies
Restaurant chains in the United States
Chinese restaurants
Restaurants established in 1993
2012 mergers and acquisitions
2019 mergers and acquisitions
Privately held companies based in Arizona